Touch France (TF) is the governing body of Touch rugby in France created in Grenoble in 2001. It is a member of the Federation of International Touch (FIT) since 2004.

Role 
Touch France aims to encourage and develop the practice of the game called Touch rugby (touch rugby or touch football) by applying the set of rules created by the Federation of International Touch (FIT). It manages and regulates the practice of Touch and defends the interests of this sport at local, national and international levels.

French national teams 
In the Touch Football World Cup or in the European Championships, France is represented through its national teams.
 XO – Mixed Open 
 WO – Women Open 
 MO – Men Open 
 W27 – Women +27 
 M30 – Men +30 
 X30 – Mixed +30
 M35 – Men +35 
 M40 – Men +40 
 X15 – Mixed U15 
 X18 – Mixed U18 
 G18 – Girls U18

French Championship 
The French Championship takes place every year since 2012. It was called CFCT as for Championnat de France des clubs de Touch (Touch Club French Championship) and is now called SuperTouch since 2019. A youth french touch championship has also been created in 2019 : the Supertouch Academies.

Main tournaments in France 
 Winter Touch – Grenoble (Isère)
 Tournoi international de Voglans – Voglans (Savoy)
 100% Fun Touch – Dourdan (Essonne)
 Riviera Touch – Saint-Laurent-du-Var/Nice (Alpes-Maritimes)
 Spring Touch – Saint-Sébastien-sur-Loire/Nantes (Loire-Atlantique)
 Touch in Paris – Gif-sur-Yvette (Essonne)
 Volcanoes Tournament – Beaumont/Clermont-Ferrand (Puy-de-Dome)
 Elegance Touch (Women Elite Tournament) – Meudon (Hauts-de-Seine)
 Tournoi du Cassoulet – Toulouse (Haute-Garonne)

French teams

See also
 Touch Football Australia
 Touch Football World Cup
 Federation of International Touch
 Touch Football

References 

Touch (sport)
Sports governing bodies in France